The 2009 Auburn Tigers football team represented Auburn University during the 2009 NCAA Division I FBS football season. The Tigers were led by first year head coach Gene Chizik. Despite playing the 12th toughest schedule in the nation, the Tigers finished the season 8–5 (3–5 in SEC play) and won the Outback Bowl 38–35 in overtime against Northwestern.

While Auburn was unranked at the end of the season in both major polls, several BCS participating computer rating systems such as Sagarin (#22), Massey (#22), Peter Wolfe (#25), Howell (#24), David Wilson (#21), Team Rankings (#18) and the FACT Foundation (#21) included the Tigers in their final top 25 rankings.

The offense finished the season ranked 2nd in the SEC and 16th in the nation (with just under 432 yards per game), while the defense struggled with depth issues and finished 68th and 2nd worst in the SEC. The pass efficiency defense however was 3rd best in the SEC and ranked 22nd in the nation.

Coaching change
On December 3, 2008, Auburn University announced that 10-year head coach Tommy Tuberville would not return for an eleventh season.  The coaching search ended less than two weeks later when Auburn announced Iowa State's second-year head coach and former Auburn defensive coordinator Gene Chizik as the Tigers' next head coach. Auburn had interviewed at least eight coaches, including Buffalo's Turner Gill and TCU's Gary Patterson.

Schedule
Auburn's schedule consisted of eight Southeastern Conference opponents (four home, four away) and four non-conference opponents. Auburn opened the season against Louisiana Tech. It was the twelfth matchup between the schools and the first meeting since 2004. The Tigers also hosted Mid-American Conference opponent Ball State for the third time. Also, Football Championship Subdivision foe Furman visited for the first time since 1956. Auburn began conference play in the second week, hosting Mississippi State. The following week, the Tigers hosted West Virginia, the second game in a home-and-home series between the two teams. The Tigers had previously faced all twelve regular season opponents, with Auburn holding the all-time series lead going into the season against all but Alabama (33–39–1), LSU (19–23–1), and West Virginia (0–1).

Depth chart
Starters and backups.

Rankings

Coaching staff

*Entering season

Game summaries

Louisiana Tech

Source: Louisiana Tech vs. Auburn - College Football Box Score - September 5, 2009

Mississippi State

Source: Mississippi State vs. Auburn - College Football Box Score - September 12, 2009

West Virginia

Source: West Virginia vs. Auburn - College Football Game Recap - September 19, 2009

Ball State

Source: Ball State vs. Auburn - College Football Box Score - September 26, 2009

Tennessee

Source: Auburn vs. Tennessee - College Football Game Recap - October 3, 2009

Arkansas

Source: Auburn vs. Arkansas - College Football Box Score - October 10, 2009

Kentucky

Sources: Kentucky vs. Auburn - College Football Box Score - October 17, 2009

LSU

Sources: Auburn vs. LSU - College Football Box Score - October 24, 2009

Ole Miss

Sources: Ole Miss vs. Auburn - College Football Box Score - October 31, 2009

Furman

Sources: Furman vs. Auburn - College Football Box Score - November 7, 2009

Georgia

Sources: Auburn vs. Georgia - College Football Box Score - November 14, 2009

Alabama

Sources: Alabama vs. Auburn - College Football Box Score - November 27, 2009

Northwestern

Sources: Northwestern vs. Auburn - College Football Box Score - January 1, 2010

References

Auburn
Auburn Tigers football seasons
ReliaQuest Bowl champion seasons
Auburn Tigers football